Henry of England may refer to:

Henry I of England (–1135), King of England from 1100
Henry II of England (1133–1189), King of England from 1154
Henry III of England (1207–1272), King of England from 1216
Henry IV of England (1367–1413), King of England from 1399
Henry V of England (1386–1422), King of England from 1413
Henry VI of England (1421–1471), King of England from 1422 to 1461 and 1470 to 1471
Henry VII of England (1457–1509), King of England from 1485
Henry VIII (1491–1547), King of England from 1509

See also
Henry (son of Edward I) (1268–1274), heir to the throne of England from 1272
 Henry Benedict Stuart (1725–1807), Jacobite pretender to the British throne
Henry the Young King (1155–1183), son of Henry II; crowned junior king of England during the reign of his father
King Henry (disambiguation)
Prince Henry (disambiguation)
Roy Henry, composer probably identical to Henry V